Asipovichy District (Osipovichsky raion) is a raion (district) in Mogilev Region, Belarus, the administrative center is the town of Asipovichy. In 2009, its population was 52,447. The population of Asipovichy accounts for 62.0% of the district's population.

Geography
The major rivers in the raion are Berezina River and its tributaries, Svislach River and Ptich River. The Asipovichy Reservoir is on the Svislach. The largerst lake is Lake Lochinskoye.

Transport
The railroad branches Minsk-Bobruysk and Mahilyow-Baranovichi and the automobile road Minsk-Homiel run through the district.

References

External links
History of the region

 
Districts of Mogilev Region